Vishva Malla (died 1560)  was a Malla Dynasty King of Bhaktapur, Nepal from 1547 to 1560. Unlike many of the other Malla rulers, there is little evidence today that this king was particularly active in construction developments in the Durbar Square in Bhaktapur.

References

Malla rulers of Bhaktapur
1560 deaths
Year of birth unknown
16th-century Nepalese people